There are twenty-two major facilities that make up the RI State Park system. This includes eight state (saltwater) beaches and five (non-surf) beaches, along with smaller public use lands managed by the Division of Parks and Recreation within the Rhode Island Department of Environmental Management.

State parks

State beaches

Other Division of Parks and Recreation lands 
The State of Rhode Island Division of Parks and Recreation manages other state lands which do not have a state park or state beach designation.

References

Note: All data come from the respective state park's webpage unless otherwise noted.

External links

Rhode Island State Parks Rhode Island Department of Environmental Management Division of Parks & Recreation

 
Rhode Island state parks
State parks